Márk Kosznovszky (born 17 April 2002) is a Hungarian footballer who plays as a midfielder for Tiszakécske on loan from MTK.

Career

Club career

In 2019, Kosznovszky signed for Italian Serie A side Parma, where he made 1 appearance and scored 0 goals. On 22 May 2021, he debuted for Parma during a 0–3 loss to Sampdoria. In 2021, Kosznovszky signed for MTK in the Hungarian top flight. Before the second half of 2021–22, he was sent on loan to Hungarian second tier club Tiszakécske.

International career

He represented Hungary at the 2019 FIFA U-17 World Cup.

References

External links
 

2002 births
Living people
Hungarian footballers
Hungary youth international footballers
Parma Calcio 1913 players
MTK Budapest FC players
Tiszakécske FC footballers